Louis Jean Girod was Governor General of Pondicherry in the Second French Colonial Empire under Third Republic.

References

Titles Held

French colonial governors and administrators
Governors of French India
People of the French Third Republic
1856 births
1922 deaths
People from Albertville